Chungam is a small junction in Kottayam city in Kerala state, Southern India. The junction borders the Meenachil river, which is one of the medium range rivers, but well known through Arundhati Roy's famous book The God of Small Things. Most of the events in the book took place in Chungam. Aymanam village, which is mentioned in the book, is about three kilometers away from Chungam. The oldest college and school in Kerala and India are here. The road that passes through Chungam is an alternate route to reach Kottayam Medical College.

Etymology 
Chungam is the Malayalam equivalent of tax. So all the locations where the tax was collected came to be known as Chungam; indeed Kerala has a number of places with the same name.

Education 
The CMS College and the CMS College Higher Secondary School; both around 200 years of age were built by the Rev. Benjamin Baily of the Church Missionary Society, London. They were built with the generous help and assistance of Col. Munroe, the then Resident of the East India Company, and HH Rani Gauri Laxmi Bhai, the reagent queen of the erstwhile Travencore state. 

CMS College is the ancient seat of learning in India. It once had the largest hall in Asia. The Great Hall, as it's called, is truly a work of art. The same place has one of Kerala's ancient Seminaries and one of the first Malayalam press too. The Orthodox Theological Seminary is the seat of the reformation that has changed the Kerala Syrian Christian Beliefs. The CMS press, one of the first of its kind in Kerala, was started by the Rev. Benjamin Bailey. He was not happy with the existing models and he made a new one with the help of a blacksmith and a carpenter and with an Encyclopaedia! The Press is also the first in South India. It still houses Bailie's ancient press, printing devices, and other published works. He is the one who has standardized the official Malayalam script and accent; thus making Malayalam more than a mere dialectical variant of Tamil. The CMS College Higher Secondary School is now housed in his ancient house. Bailey had made the Holy Trinity Cathedral; which is one of the biggest churches of the CSI church.

Suburbs of Kottayam